Harry Gilberg (26 June 1923 – 16 September 1994) was an English professional footballer who played as an inside forward. He made 135 league appearances in English football between 1946 and 1956, playing for three clubs.

Career
Born in Tottenham, Gilberg was Jewish. He made 135 appearances in the Football League for Tottenham Hotspur, Queens Park Rangers and Brighton & Hove Albion.

References

1923 births
1994 deaths
Jewish footballers
English footballers
Tottenham Hotspur F.C. players
Queens Park Rangers F.C. players
Brighton & Hove Albion F.C. players
English Football League players
Association football inside forwards
Footballers from Tottenham